Roberta Angelilli (born 1 February 1965 in Rome) is an Italian politician.

She has been a Member of the European Parliament from 1994 to 2014. She served also as Vice President of the European Parliament from 1 July 2009 to 1 July 2014.

In 2014 she was candidate for MEP with the New Centre-Right – Union of the Centre, but she was not re-elected.

Roberta Angelilli was again a candidate for MEP in 2019 on the Brothers of Italy list, but she was not elected even on this occasion.

Education
 1993: Graduate in political science at La Sapienza University of Rome

Career
 1993–1996: Secretary-General of the Youth Front
 1996–1997: President of Youth Action
 since 1985: Director of the AN Young Entrepreneurs Office
 since 1998: Responsible for Community policies for the Rome section of AN
 1985–1992: Director of the environmental association "Fare Verde"
 Founder of the international voluntary work organisation "Movimento Comunità"
 1994–2014: Member of the European Parliament

References

External links
 

1965 births
Living people
Politicians from Rome
National Alliance (Italy) MEPs
The People of Freedom MEPs
MEPs for Italy 1994–1999
MEPs for Italy 2009–2014
MEPs for Italy 2004–2009
MEPs for Italy 1999–2004
20th-century women MEPs for Italy
21st-century women MEPs for Italy
Italian Social Movement politicians
New Centre-Right politicians
Identity and Action politicians